Alessandro Ferreira Leonardo (born 10 March 1987), commonly known as Sandro, is a Brazilian-born Hong Kong professional football player who currently plays as a forward for Campeonato Carioca club Madureira.

Club career

Citizen
Sandro was sent off after a second bookable offence in the match against South China, when he pressured Zhang Chunhui to take his goal kick quickly and was considered by the referee to have obstructed the goalkeeper. Citizen lost the match 2–1.

Sandro scored a hat-trick against Tai Po on 2 May 2009 to help the club win 4–1 and end the 2008–09 season in third place in the league. On 25 October 2009, Sandro scored 5 goals for Citizen against Happy Valley at Siu Sai Wan Sports Ground, including a 50-yard lob.

With Citizen, Sandro won the Hong Kong Senior Shield after defeating South China in the final on penalties. But his contract was not renewed by the club at the end of the season.

Metro Gallery
Sandro joined Metro Gallery/Rangers for the 2011–12 season. He scored on his debut for the club in the 1–4 defeat away to Pegasus. He scored again in the second game against his old club Citizen to tie the match 2–2.

Pegasus
Sandro joined Pegasus for an undisclosed fee before the start of 2012–13 season. However, he only scored 1 goal in 10 matches and was released by the club on 31 December 2012.

Citizen
Sandro re-joined Citizen as a free transfer after he was released by Pegasus.

Kitchee
On 15 July 2015, Sandro was formally signed as a Kitchee player. There was controversy surrounding the move as he had signed a pre-contractual agreement with Eastern nine months prior. While Sandro claimed, through his lawyer's advice that the agreement was not legally binding, Eastern's Executive Director Peter Leung took league action after the Hong Kong Football Association was unable to resolve the situation. Eventually the situation was resolved.

During the 2016–17 season, Sandro scored 21 goals en route to winning the Golden Boot. He was rewarded with a new contract on 11 July 2017.

Tai Po
After spending the latter half of 2018 with Indonesian club PSM Makassar, Sandro returned to Hong Kong. He joined Tai Po on 6 February 2019 ahead of their 2019 AFC Cup campaign.

On 4 May 2019, Sandro scored two goals in the second to lead Tai Po to a 2–1 comeback victory against title rivals R&F. The win clinched Tai Po's first league title in club history.

On 26 December 2019, after the match against Lee Man in the semi-final of the Senior Shield, Sandro announced that he would leave the club with immediate effect.

Eastern
On 1 January 2020, less than a week after leaving Tai Po, Sandro signed with Eastern. He scored on his debut for the club in a 2–1 win over Lee Man. 

On 1 June 2021, Sandro left the club.

Guangxi Pingguo Haliao
On 2 March 2022, Sandro signed with China League One club Guangxi Pingguo Haliao.

Madureira
On 11 February 2023, Sandro returned to Brazil after 15 years and joined Madureira.

International career
Sandro was born and raised in Brazil, but became a naturalized Hong Kong citizen through residency. Sandro made his international debut and scored his first goal for Hong Kong against Myanmar on 7 November 2015.

Career statistics

Club

International

International goals
Scores and results list Hong Kong's goal tally first.

Honours

Club 
Citizen
Hong Kong Senior Shield: 2010–11

Eastern
Hong Kong FA Cup: 2019–20
Hong Kong Senior Shield: 2019–20
Hong Kong Sapling Cup: 2020–21

Kitchee
Hong Kong Premier League: 2016–17, 2017–18
Hong Kong Senior Shield: 2016–17
Hong Kong FA Cup: 2016–17, 2017–18
Hong Kong Sapling Cup: 2017–18
Hong Kong League Cup: 2015–16
Hong Kong Community Cup: 2016–17
AFC Cup Play-Off: 2015–16

Tai Po
Hong Kong Premier League: 2018–19

Individual
Hong Kong First Division Golden Boot: 2011–12
Hong Kong Premier League Golden Boot: 2016–17

References

External sources
 
 Alessandro Ferreira Leonardo at HKFA
 

Living people
1987 births
Hong Kong footballers
Hong Kong international footballers
Hong Kong expatriate footballers
Brazilian footballers
Brazilian emigrants to Hong Kong
Association football forwards
Hong Kong First Division League players
Hong Kong Premier League players
Liga 1 (Indonesia) players
China League One players
Citizen AA players
Hong Kong Rangers FC players
TSW Pegasus FC players
Yuen Long FC players
Kitchee SC players
PSM Makassar players
Tai Po FC players
Eastern Sports Club footballers
Guangxi Pingguo Haliao F.C. players
Madureira Esporte Clube players
Naturalized footballers of Hong Kong
Hong Kong League XI representative players
Expatriate footballers in Indonesia
Expatriate footballers in Brazil